Mel Baleson is a South African former professional tennis player.

A native of Johannesburg, Baleson featured in doubles main draws at Wimbledon and played collegiate tennis for the University of Nevada, Reno. He won the WCAC singles championship as a freshman, then had a sit out his sophomore and junior seasons due to a NCAA rule change, before returning as a senior in 1974.

Baleson and his cousin Glenn Grisillo set a Guinness World Record in 1971 for the longest continuous tennis match, at 73 hours and 25 minutes, to raise funds for the University of Nevada.

References

External links
 
 

Year of birth missing (living people)
Living people
South African male tennis players
Nevada Wolf Pack athletes
College men's tennis players in the United States
Tennis players from Johannesburg